Joey Belterman (born 18 August 1993 in Ruurlo) is a Dutch footballer who currently plays as a midfielder for RKZVC Zieuwent.

Club career
Belterman came through the FC Twente youth ranks but made his Eredivisie debut for Heracles in February 2012 against Roda JC. In summer 2014 he moved to Eerste Divisie club FC Den Bosch.

Belterman joined Tweede Divisie side Spakenburg in summer 2016.

References

External links
 Voetbal International profile 

1993 births
Living people
People from Berkelland
Footballers from Gelderland
Association football midfielders
Dutch footballers
Heracles Almelo players
FC Den Bosch players
SV Spakenburg players
Eredivisie players
Eerste Divisie players